Suryakant Paswan is an Indian politician from Bihar, leader of Communist Party of India and a Member of the Bihar Legislative Assembly. He won the Bakhri Assembly constituency in the 2020 Bihar Legislative Assembly election. Also he is the National secretary of All India Dalit Rights Movement.

References

Living people
Bihar MLAs 2020–2025
Communist Party of India politicians from Bihar
Year of birth missing (living people)